Labourdonnaisia is a genus of plants in the family Sapotaceae found in tropical Asia, described as a genus in 1841.

Labourdonnaisia is native to certain islands in the Indian Ocean (Madagascar, Mauritius, Réunion).

The genus is named for Bertrand-François Mahé de La Bourdonnais (1699 – 1753), French governor of Mauritius 1735–1740.

The Labourdonnaisia tree species can also sometimes be confused with the Mascarene trees of the genus Sideroxylon. However the Labourdonnaisia species have parallel venation on their leaves, while the Sideroxylon species have densely netted leaf-venation and strong midribs under their leaves.

species
 Labourdonnaisia calophylloides Bojer - Mauritius, Réunion
 Labourdonnaisia glauca Bojer - Mauritius
 Labourdonnaisia lecomtei Aubrév. - Madagascar
 Labourdonnaisia madagascariensis Pierre ex Baill. - Madagascar
 Labourdonnaisia revoluta Bojer - Mauritius
 Labourdonnaisia richardiana Pierre ex Aubrév. - Madagascar
 Labourdonnaisia thouarsii Pierre ex Dubard - Madagascar

References

Sapotoideae
Sapotaceae genera
Taxa named by Wenceslas Bojer